Barbora Raníková (born 12 March 1985) is a Czech European Handballer player for Metz Handball and the Czech national team.

References

1985 births
Living people
Czech female handball players
Czech expatriate sportspeople in France